Winston Chandarbhan Dookeran  (born 24 June 1943) is a Trinidadian and Tobagonian politician and economist as well as international public official. Dookeran is the current Secretary-General of EUCLID, an intergovernmental institution of higher learning. He previously served as Political Leader of the Congress of the People, central bank governor, minister of finance, and minister of foreign affairs.

Early life 
Born in 1943, in Rio Claro, Trinidad and Tobago to an Indo-Trinidadian family, he is one of the seven children of Mewalal and Sumintra Dookeran. Dookeran received his early education in Trinidad.

Education
The young Winston Dookeran attended the prestigious Naparima College in San Fernando, Trinidad.

He then went on to attend the University of Manitoba, Winnipeg, Manitoba, Canada, where he graduated with a Bachelor of Arts in Honours Economics in 1966. It was there that Dookeran made his first entry into politics and he served as the president of the University of Manitoba Students' Union.

He subsequently attended the London School of Economics, where he obtained his master's degree in economics in 1969.

Economist and politician
Dookeran spent some fifteen years as a lecturer at the Department of Economics at the University of the West Indies. In 1981 he contested the constituency of Chaguanas as a candidate of the United Labour Front (ULF). He was victorious at the polls and was therefore elected as a Member of Parliament, and served in the House of Representatives of Trinidad and Tobago.

in 1986, when the ULF merged with other parties to form the National Alliance for Reconstruction (NAR), Dookeran again contested the constituency of Chaguanas, and won. Under the leadership of Arthur Napoleon Raymond Robinson, the NAR had massive success at the polls, winning an unprecedented 33 of the 36 constituencies. Dookeran was made a Cabinet member as he was appointed Minister of Planning and Mobilization.

Dookeran later became Deputy Political Leader of the NAR was a senior member of the government, and acted on several occasions as Prime Minister, most notably during the attempted coup of 1990 when Prime Minister A. N. R. Robinson was held hostage by the Jamaat al Muslimeen.

Dookeran lost his seat in the 1991 elections.

He later became Senior Economist at the United Nations Economic Commission for Latin America and the Caribbean (UNECLAC). He was also a member of the executive board of the Inter-American Development Bank (IADB) and the governor of the Caribbean Development Bank (CDB).

In July 1997 he was appointed as Governor of the Central Bank of Trinidad and Tobago. He held that post till 2002. Later that year he joined the United National Congress and won the St Augustine constituency. In October 2005 he succeeded Basdeo Panday as political leader of the United National Congress after being nominated by Panday unopposed. Dookeran would later form his own political party, the Congress of the People (COP), which in coalition with his former party would contest and win the May 2010 snap elections.

Dookeran was appointed Minister of Finance in 2010 for the new People's Partnership coalition government and began a series of programs designed to jump-start the stagnant economy. His stewardship was confirmed by Standard and Poor's rating of Trinidad and Tobago as AA- with a stable outlook in December 2011. In June 2012, Dookeran was appointed Minister of Foreign Affairs, a portfolio he held until June 2015.

International public official and educator
After his political career, Dookeran became a Professor of Practice at the University of the West Indies (Saint Augustine Campus) and consultant for international organizations. He became Under-Secretary-General of EUCLID (Euclid University) in 2019 and was appointed as Secretary-General in July 2020.

Publications
 Leadership and Governance in Small States. Getting Development Right, Co-edited with Akhil Malaki.
 Identities, State and Markets: Looking at Social Change in Latin America. Edited by Jose Havet, published by Canadian Scholars' Press, Inc., 1999.
 The New Regionalism: Caribbean – Canada Trade Agenda (co-authored with Miriam L. Campanella).
 The Caribbean Quest: Directions for Structural Reforms in a Global Economy. Guest joint editor, Special Issue Vol XXVIII: 1–2, Nordic Journal of Latin American and Caribbean Studies. Published by The Institute of Latin American Studies, Stockholm University, 1999.
 Choices and Change: Reflections on the Caribbean. Published by the International Development Bank and Johns Hopkins University Press. July 1996.
 
Financial Reporting in the Caribbean's Public Sector Assessment and Challenges
 Winston Dookeran and David Walker (2010) in Studies in Accounting, Finance and Management by Bhattacharyya, Udaybhanu (ed.), Netaji Subhas Open University, Kolkata, India. web: http://www.wbnsou.ac.in/bulletin_board/publications/other_publications/other/studiesinacctfinmangdetails12052011.pdf

References

Works cited

External links
 Dookeran's website

Trinidad and Tobago economists
Trinidad and Tobago socialists
Members of the House of Representatives (Trinidad and Tobago)
Foreign ministers of Trinidad and Tobago
Finance ministers of Trinidad and Tobago
Governors of the Central Bank of Trinidad and Tobago
Living people
Trinidad and Tobago people of Indian descent
Trinidad and Tobago Hindus
Congress of the People (Trinidad and Tobago) politicians
1943 births
People from Tunapuna–Piarco
National Alliance for Reconstruction politicians
United Labour Front politicians
People from Mayaro–Rio Claro
Recipients of Pravasi Bharatiya Samman